Halifax Regional Municipality, formally known as Halifax is located in Nova Scotia, Canada.  The municipality is governed by a mayor (elected at large) and a sixteen-person Regional Council, who are elected by geographic district; municipal elections occur every leap year.

The Halifax Regional Council has also established smaller "community councils" wherein three or more councilors from a geographic area agree to form these councils to deal primarily with local development issues.  Most community council decisions are subject to final approval by regional council.

The Halifax Regional Council has responsibility for the Halifax Regional Police, Halifax Public Libraries, Halifax Regional Fire and Emergency, Halifax Regional Water Commission, Halifax Transit, parks and recreation, public works and waste management.

Emergency services
Two areas of contention during the post-amalgamation years have been in the areas of police and fire services.

Police services
Halifax Regional Police is an amalgamation of the municipal forces from the City of Halifax, City of Dartmouth, and Town of Bedford.  Areas that were formerly part of the Municipality of the County of Halifax were policed by the Royal Canadian Mounted Police (RCMP) under a provincial policing contract.

Since amalgamation, HRP has been restricted to patrolling the former cities of Halifax and Dartmouth, the Sambro loop and the town of Bedford, while the RCMP provide rural policing services as well as highway traffic enforcement.  Jurisdictional boundaries have been relaxed in recent years, allowing more integration between both forces to allow for better coverage and response.

Fire services
Unlike policing services, Halifax Fire and Emergency (HRFE) is an amalgamation of all fire departments in Halifax County.  This created some controversy in rural areas where predominantly volunteer fire companies were being stripped of equipment and trucks which local communities had fund-raised for during the pre-amalgamation period; this equipment was being relocated to service the urban core.  This has since been halted, although there is still some tension between the professional paid HRFE members in the urban core and their volunteer rural counterparts.

Municipal budget
Since its creation, rapid property value increases and new construction have resulted in HRM's budget growing to $589 million in 2005/06, up from $439 million in 1996.  This has allowed HRM to proceed with major capital projects such as an extension of municipally-supplied water to Fall River, breaking ground on the new sewage treatment system (Harbour Solutions), and establishment of Metrolink, a bus rapid transit system.

Federal representation
The Halifax Regional Municipality is represented by the following federal ridings:

  Halifax Metropolitan Area 
 Halifax
 Halifax West

Dartmouth Metropolitan Area
 Dartmouth—Cole Harbour

 Bedford
 Halifax West

Rest of the municipality
 Halifax West
 Sackville—Eastern Shore
 Central Nova
 Cumberland—Colchester—Musquodoboit Valley
 South Shore—St. Margaret's

Provincial representation
In the last three provincial elections over 50% of the population of HRM who voted, has voted for the provincial New Democratic Party (NDP), placing the region's voters outside the mainstream of provincial politics in outlying more rural areas which are split between a Liberal/Conservative voting pattern.  It can be argued that HRM's recent voting pattern has actually placed the provincial (and federal) NDP or social democratic politics in general, into the political mainstream for the province. That being said, a majority of the people voted for the Liberals this past election.

See also
 2004 Halifax Regional Municipality municipal election
 2008 Halifax Regional Municipality municipal election
 2012 Halifax Regional Municipality municipal election
 2016 Halifax Regional Municipality municipal election

References